The 1913–14 Challenge Cup was the 18th staging of rugby league's oldest knockout competition, the Challenge Cup.

First round

Second round

Quarterfinals

Semifinals

Final

A Hull team featuring Billy Batten and Jim Devereux defeated Wakefield Trinity 6-0. This was Hull's first Challenge Cup win in their fourth final appearance.

Hull: 6

Tries: Jack Harrison, Alfred Francis

Wakefield Trinity: 0

Half-time: 0-0

Attendance: 19,000 (at Thrum Hall, Halifax)

Teams:
Hull: Rogers, Jack Harrison, Billy Batten, Herb Gilbert, Alfred Francis, Jim Devereux, Billie Anderson, Tom Herridge, William Holder, Dick Taylor, Percy Oldham, Joe Hammill, Steve Darmody

Wakefield Trinity: Leonard Land, Benjamin Johnson, William "Billy" Lynch, Thomas "Tommy" Poynton, Bruce Howarth, Jonty Parkin, William Milligan/Millican, Albert Dixon, Arthur Kenealy "Nealy" Crosland, William Beattie, Herbert Kershaw, Ernest Parkin, Arthur Burton

References

Challenge Cup
Challenge Cup